Kamo is a suburb in Northern Whangārei.  approximately five minutes drive from the Whangārei CBD. The name comes from a Māori word meaning "eyelash", but has also been said to mean "to bubble up", referring to hot springs in the area. Mount Parakiore is a volcanic dome rising 391 m to the northwest of the town. It is about one million years old, and part of the Harbour Fault which also includes Mount Hikurangi near Hikurangi, and Parihaka in Whangārei.

History 
Coal mining was an early industry in the area. Tunnelling first started in 1875, but it was not practical to carry the coal over the unmetalled roads to Whangārei wharf. In 1882 a short railway line was completed between Kamo and Whangārei to carry the coal. This was one of Northland's first railways. The railway still exists as part of the North Auckland Line. The mine closed in 1955, with the seams worked out. Limonite was also quarried at Kamo.

A Wesleyan church was built in 1881, the Anglican All Saints Church in 1886, and a Presbyterian church in 1911. The first Roman Catholic church in the Whangārei area opened in Kamo about 1881.

Kamo became a Town District in 1884, at which point it had a population of 410, slightly smaller than Whangārei.

The town was known for its hot springs in the early 20th century, although several people died of suffocation in covered baths between 1901 and 1920. The iron-rich water was promoted as a health tonic.

In the early 1960s the boundaries of Whangārei city expanded to include Kamo.

Demographics

Kamo had a population of 9,855 at the 2018 New Zealand census, an increase of 1,254 people (14.6%) since the 2013 census, and an increase of 2,379 people (31.8%) since the 2006 census. There were 3,402 households, comprising 4,695 males and 5,166 females, giving a sex ratio of 0.91 males per female, with 2,187 people (22.2%) aged under 15 years, 1,713 (17.4%) aged 15 to 29, 3,864 (39.2%) aged 30 to 64, and 2,097 (21.3%) aged 65 or older.

Ethnicities were 76.7% European/Pākehā, 30.7% Māori, 4.1% Pacific peoples, 6.5% Asian, and 1.7% other ethnicities. People may identify with more than one ethnicity.

The percentage of people born overseas was 16.6, compared with 27.1% nationally.

Although some people chose not to answer the census's question about religious affiliation, 49.1% had no religion, 38.1% were Christian, 2.3% had Māori religious beliefs, 0.9% were Hindu, 0.2% were Muslim, 0.8% were Buddhist and 1.8% had other religions.

Of those at least 15 years old, 1,116 (14.6%) people had a bachelor's or higher degree, and 1,683 (21.9%) people had no formal qualifications. 972 people (12.7%) earned over $70,000 compared to 17.2% nationally. The employment status of those at least 15 was that 3,378 (44.1%) people were employed full-time, 930 (12.1%) were part-time, and 345 (4.5%) were unemployed.

Education 
The school was established in 1960. This school has a friendly rivalry with its two neighbouring schools, Whangarei Boys' High School and Whangarei Girls' High School.

All these schools are coeducational. Rolls are as of  Totara Grove has a decile rating of 2. Hurupaki School has a decile of 8. The others all have a decile rating of 5.

Kamo Primary School opened in July 1873 in a private house. It had grown to 64 students by the time it moved into Kamo Public Hall in 1877. and it moved to its own building in 1881. In 1946, it moved to its present site. The older students were split to Kamo Intermediate in 1964. Kamo East School opened in 1966, and was later renamed to Totara Grove School.

Notable people 
All Blacks Bunny Finlayson, Bevan Holmes and Ian Jones played for Kamo Rugby Club as did Auckland Blues player Justin Collins and Auckland Blues coach Peter Sloane.

Michael Hill (Jeweller and Entrepreneur) attended Kamo High School.

Stacey Michelsen (Black Stick) attended Kamo Intermediate School

Ross Ihaka, Pickering Award recipient and co-originator of the R programming language, attended Kamo High School.

Park Kyung, a rapper and composer from South Korean boy group Block B, attended Kamo High School.

See also
Hurupaki Mountain, a mountain 1.5 kilometers from the township.

References

External links
 Kamo website

Populated places in the Northland Region
Whangarei District
Suburbs of Whangārei